The 1998 African Cup of Nations Final was a football match that took place on 28 February 1998 at the Stade du 4-Août in Ouagadougou, Burkina Faso, to determine the winner of the 1998 African Cup of Nations, the football championship of Africa organized by the Confederation of African Football (CAF).

Egypt won the title for the fourth time by beating South Africa 2–0.

Route to the final

Match details

Details

References

Final
1998
Africa Cup of Nations Final
African
South Africa national soccer team matches
February 1998 sports events in Africa
20th century in Ouagadougou
Sport in Ouagadougou